The women's K-2 500 metres competition in canoeing at the 2008 Summer Olympics took place at the Shunyi Olympic Rowing-Canoeing Park in Beijing.  The K-2 event is raced in two-person kayaks.

Competition consists of three rounds: the heats, the semifinals, and the final. All boats compete in the heats. The top three finishers in each of the two heats advances directly to the final, while the remaining top nine finishers in both heats move on to the semifinal. The top three finishers in the semifinals join the heats winners in the final.

Heats took place on August 19, the semifinal took place on August 21, and the final was on August 23.

Schedule
All times are China Standard Time (UTC+8)

Medalists

Results

Heats
Qualification Rules: 1..3->Final, 4..7->Semifinal + 8th best time, Rest Out

Heat 1

Heat 2

Semifinal
Qualification Rules: 1..3->Final, Rest Out

Final

References

Sports-reference.com 2008 women's K-2 500 m results.
Yahoo! August 19, 2008 sprint heat results. – accessed August 19, 2008.
Yahoo! August 21, 2008 sprint final results. – accessed August 21, 2008.

Women's K-2 500
Olympic
Women's events at the 2008 Summer Olympics